Peronospora farinosa f.sp. betae is a forma specialis of Peronospora farinosa, attacking sugar beet.

References

External links
 Index Fungorum
 USDA ARS Fungal Database

Water mould plant pathogens and diseases
Food plant pathogens and diseases
Peronosporales
Forma specialis taxa